Olena Zhupiieva-Viazova or Olena Zhupiyeva-Vyazova or Yelena Zhupiyeva-Vyazova  (born 18 April 1960) is a retired female track and field athlete from Ukraine, who competed mainly in the 10,000 metres. Competing for the Soviet Union as Yelena Zhupiyeva, she won a silver medal in the 10,000 m at the 1987 World Championships in Rome and a bronze medal in the 10,000m at the 1988 Seoul Olympics. As Yelena Vyazova, she won the 1992 CIS Athletics Championships 10,000 m title, and competed at the 1992 Barcelona Olympics.

International competitions

See also
List of Olympic medalists in athletics (women)
List of 1988 Summer Olympics medal winners
List of World Athletics Championships medalists (women)
10,000 metres at the Olympics 
10,000 metres at the World Championships in Athletics
List of 5000 metres national champions (women)

References

1960 births
Living people
Russian female long-distance runners
Ukrainian female long-distance runners
Soviet female long-distance runners
Olympic female long-distance runners
Olympic athletes of the Soviet Union
Olympic athletes of the Unified Team
Olympic bronze medalists for the Soviet Union
Olympic bronze medalists in athletics (track and field)
Athletes (track and field) at the 1988 Summer Olympics
Athletes (track and field) at the 1992 Summer Olympics
Medalists at the 1988 Summer Olympics
World Athletics Championships athletes for the Soviet Union
World Athletics Championships medalists
CIS Athletics Championships winners
Russian Athletics Championships winners